Events in the year 1941 in the British Mandate of Palestine.

Incumbents
 High Commissioner – Sir Harold MacMichael
 Emir of Transjordan – Abdullah I bin al-Hussein
 Prime Minister of Transjordan – Tawfik Abu al-Huda

Events

 15 May – The Palmach is established.
 14 July – World War II: The Armistice of Saint Jean d'Acre (also known as the "Convention of Acre") is signed on at the "Sidney Smith Barracks" on the outskirts of the city of Acre, ending the Allied invasion of Vichy French-controlled Syria and Lebanon.
 2 November – The kibbutz of Ramat HaShofet is established.

Births
 24 January – Dan Shechtman, Israeli physicist and winner of the Nobel Prize in Physics
 25 January – Ya'akov Shefi, Israeli politician
 11 February – Avraham Hirschson, Israeli politician (died 2022)
 13 March – Mahmoud Darwish, Palestinian Arab poet and writer of prose (died 2008)
 1 April – Gideon Gadot, Israeli journalist (died 2012)
 1 April – Michael Dezer, Israeli-American real estate developer
 5 April – Eliyahu Bakshi-Doron, Israeli rabbi and Rishon LeTzion (died 2020)
 8 April – Ya'akov Shahar, Israeli businessman
 20 April – Ayala Procaccia, Israeli jurist, judge on the Israeli Supreme Court
 22 April – Amir Pnueli, Israeli computer scientist and Turing Award winner (died 2009)
 13 June – Esther Ofarim, Israeli folk singer
 7 July – Yisrael Poliakov, Israeli singer, actor and entertainer (died 2007)
 13 July – Ehud Manor, Israeli songwriter, translator, and radio and TV personality (died 2005)
 19 August – Gabriela Shalev, Israeli jurist and diplomat
 10 October – Hanan Goldblatt, Israeli actor
 24 November – Joel Moses, Israeli-American mathematician, computer scientist, and professor at the Massachusetts Institute of Technology (died 2022) 
Full date unknown
Eitan Avitsur – Israeli composer and conductor
Ze'ev Herzog – Israeli archaeologist

Deaths

 20 May – David Raziel (born 1910), Russian-born Palestinian Jew, fighter of the Jewish underground and one of the founders of the Irgun
 2 October – Menachem Ussishkin (born 1863), Russian-born Palestinian Jew, notable Zionist leader and chairman of the Jewish National Fund

References 

 
Palestine
Years in Mandatory Palestine
Mandatory Palestine in World War II